The four causes or four explanations are, in Aristotelian thought, four fundamental types of answer to the question "why?", in analysis of change or movement in nature: the material, the formal, the efficient, and the final. Aristotle wrote that "we do not have knowledge of a thing until we have grasped its why, that is to say, its cause." While there are cases in which classifying a "cause" is difficult, or in which "causes" might merge, Aristotle held that his four "causes" provided an analytical scheme of general applicability.

Aristotle's  word aitia has, in philosophical scholarly tradition, been translated as 'cause'. This peculiar, specialized, technical, usage of the word 'cause' is not that of everyday English language. Rather, the translation of Aristotle's  that is nearest to current ordinary language is "explanation."

In Physics II.3 and Metaphysics V.2, Aristotle holds that there are four kinds of answers to "why" questions:
Matter The material cause of a change or movement. This is the aspect of the change or movement that is determined by the material that composes the moving or changing things. For a table, this might be wood; for a statue, it might be bronze or marble.
Form The formal cause of a change or movement. This is a change or movement caused by the arrangement, shape, or appearance of the thing changing or moving. Aristotle says, for example, that the ratio 2:1, and number in general, is the formal cause of the octave.
Efficient, or agent The efficient or moving cause of a change or movement. This consists of things apart from the thing being changed or moved, which interact so as to be an agency of the change or movement. For example, the efficient cause of a table is a carpenter, or a person working as one, and according to Aristotle the efficient cause of a child is a parent.
Final, end, or purpose The final cause of a change or movement. This is a change or movement for the sake of a thing to be what it is. For a seed, it might be an adult plant; for a sailboat, it might be sailing; for a ball at the top of a ramp, it might be coming to rest at the bottom.

The four "causes" are not mutually exclusive. For Aristotle, several, preferably four, answers to the question "why" have to be given to explain a phenomenon and especially the actual configuration of an object. For example, if asking why a table is such and such, an explanation in terms of the four causes would sound like this: This table is solid and brown because it is made of wood (matter); it does not collapse because it has four legs of equal length (form); it is as it is because a carpenter made it, starting from a tree (agent); it has these dimensions because it is to be used by humans (end).

Aristotle distinguished between intrinsic and extrinsic causes. Matter and form are intrinsic causes because they deal directly with the object, whereas efficient and finality causes are said to be extrinsic because they are external.

Thomas Aquinas demonstrated that only those four types of causes can exist and no others. He also introduced a priority order according to which "matter is made perfect by the form, form is made perfect by the agent, and agent is made perfect by the finality." Hence, the finality is the cause of causes or, equivalently, the queen of causes.

Definition of "cause"

In his philosophical writings, Aristotle used the Greek word αἴτιον (aition), a neuter singular form of an adjective. The Greek word had meant, perhaps originally in a "legal" context, what or who is "responsible," mostly but not always in a bad sense of "guilt" or "blame." Alternatively, it could mean "to the credit of" someone or something. The appropriation of this word by Aristotle and other philosophers reflects how the Greek experience of legal practice influenced the concern in Greek thought to determine what is responsible. The word developed other meanings, including its use in philosophy in a more abstract sense. 

About a century before Aristotle, the anonymous author of the Hippocratic text On Ancient Medicine had described the essential characteristics of a cause as it is considered in medicine:We must, therefore, consider the causes of each [medical] condition to be those things which are such that, when they are present, the condition necessarily occurs, but when they change to another combination, it ceases.

Aristotle's "four causes" 
Aristotle used the four causes to provide different answers to the question, "because of what?" The four answers to this question illuminate different aspects of how a thing comes into being or of how an event takes place.

Material 

Aristotle considers the material "cause" of an object as equivalent to the nature of the raw material out of which the object is composed. (The word "nature" for Aristotle applies to both its potential in the raw material and its ultimate finished form. In a sense this form already existed in the material: see potentiality and actuality.)

Whereas modern physics looks to simple bodies, Aristotle's physics took a more general viewpoint, and treated living things as exemplary. Nevertheless, he felt that simple natural bodies such as earth, fire, air, and water also showed signs of having their own innate sources of motion, change, and rest. Fire, for example, carries things upwards, unless stopped from doing so. Things formed by human artifice, such as beds and cloaks, have no innate tendency to become beds or cloaks.

In traditional Aristotelian philosophical terminology, material is not the same as substance. Matter has parallels with substance in so far as primary matter serves as the substratum for simple bodies which are not substance: sand and rock (mostly earth), rivers and seas (mostly water), atmosphere and wind (mostly air and then mostly fire below the moon). In this traditional terminology, 'substance' is a term of ontology, referring to really existing things; only individuals are said to be substances (subjects) in the primary sense. Secondary substance, in a different sense, also applies to man-made artifacts.

Formal 

Aristotle considers the formal "cause" as describing the pattern or form which when present makes matter into a particular type of thing, which we recognize as being of that particular type.

By Aristotle's own account, this is a difficult and controversial concept. It links with theories of forms such as those of Aristotle's teacher, Plato, but in Aristotle's own account (see his Metaphysics), he takes into account many previous writers who had expressed opinions about forms and ideas, but he shows how his own views differ from them.

Efficient 

Aristotle defines the agent or efficient "cause" of an object as that which causes change and drives transient motion (such as a painter painting a house) (see Aristotle, Physics II 3, 194b29). In many cases, this is simply the thing that brings something about. For example, in the case of a statue, it is the person chiseling away which transforms a block of marble into a statue. Only this one of the four causes is like what an ordinary English-speaker would regard as a cause.

Final 

Aristotle defines the end, purpose, or final "cause" as that for the sake of which a thing is done. Like the form, this is a controversial type of explanation in science; some have argued for its survival in evolutionary biology, while Ernst Mayr denied that it continued to play a role. It is commonly recognised that Aristotle's conception of nature is teleological in the sense that Nature exhibits functionality in a more general sense than is exemplified in the purposes that humans have. Aristotle observed that a telos does not necessarily involve deliberation, intention, consciousness, or intelligence:

According to Aristotle, a seed has the eventual adult plant as its end (i.e., as its telos) if and only if the seed would become the adult plant under normal circumstances. In Physics II.9, Aristotle hazards a few arguments that a determination of the end (i.e., final cause) of a phenomenon is more important than the others. He argues that the end is that which brings it about, so for example "if one defines the operation of sawing as being a certain kind of dividing, then this cannot come about unless the saw has teeth of a certain kind; and these cannot be unless it is of iron." According to Aristotle, once a final "cause" is in place, the material, efficient and formal "causes" follow by necessity. However, he recommends that the student of nature determine the other "causes" as well, and notes that not all phenomena have an end, e.g., chance events.

Aristotle saw that his biological investigations provided insights into the causes of things, especially into the final cause:

George Holmes Howison highlights "final causation" in presenting his theory of metaphysics, which he terms "personal idealism", and to which he invites not only man, but all (ideal) life:

However, Edward Feser argues, in line with the Aristotelian and Thomistic tradition, that finality has been greatly misunderstood. Indeed, without finality, efficient causality becomes inexplicable. Finality thus understood is not purpose but that end towards which a thing is ordered.
When a match is rubbed against the side of a matchbox, the effect is not the appearance of an elephant or the sounding of a drum, but fire.
The effect is not arbitrary because the match is ordered towards the end of fire which is realized through efficient causes. In their theoretical study of organism, more specifically propagating organisation of process, Kauffman et al. (2008) remark:

Modern science

In his Advancement of Learning (1605), Francis Bacon wrote that natural science "doth make inquiry, and take consideration of the same natures : but how? Only as to the material and efficient causes of them, and not as to the forms." Using the terminology of Aristotle, Bacon demands that, apart from the "laws of nature" themselves, the causes relevant to natural science are only efficient causes and material causes, or, to use the formulation which became famous later, natural phenomena require scientific explanation in terms of matter and motion.  

In The New Organon, Bacon divides knowledge into physics and metaphysics: From the two kinds of axioms which have been spoken of arises a just division of philosophy and the sciences, taking the received terms (which come nearest to express the thing) in a sense agreeable to my own views. Thus, let the investigation of forms, which are (in the eye of reason at least, and in their essential law) eternal and immutable, constitute Metaphysics; and let the investigation of the efficient cause, and of matter, and of the latent process, and the latent configuration (all of which have reference to the common and ordinary course of nature, not to her eternal and fundamental laws) constitute Physics. And to these let there be subordinate two practical divisions: to Physics, Mechanics; to Metaphysics, what (in a purer sense of the word) I call Magic, on account of the broadness of the ways it moves in, and its greater command over nature.

Biology
Explanations in terms of final causes remain common in evolutionary biology. Francisco J. Ayala has claimed that teleology is indispensable to biology since the concept of adaptation is inherently teleological. In an appreciation of Charles Darwin published in Nature in 1874, Asa Gray noted "Darwin's great service to Natural Science" lies in bringing back teleology "so that, instead of Morphology versus Teleology, we shall have Morphology wedded to Teleology." Darwin quickly responded, "What you say about Teleology pleases me especially and I do not think anyone else has ever noticed the point." Francis Darwin and T. H. Huxley reiterate this sentiment. The latter wrote that "the most remarkable service to the philosophy of Biology rendered by Mr. Darwin is the reconciliation of Teleology and Morphology, and the explanation of the facts of both, which his view offers." James G. Lennox states that Darwin uses the term 'Final Cause' consistently in his Species Notebook, On the Origin of Species, and after.

Contrary to the position described by Francisco J. Ayala, Ernst Mayr states that "adaptedness... is a posteriori result rather than an a priori goal-seeking." Various commentators view the teleological phrases used in modern evolutionary biology as a type of shorthand. For example, S. H. P. Madrell writes that "the proper but cumbersome way of describing change by evolutionary adaptation [may be] substituted by shorter overtly teleological statements" for the sake of saving space, but that this "should not be taken to imply that evolution proceeds by anything other than from mutations arising by chance, with those that impart an advantage being retained by natural selection." However, Lennox states that in evolution as conceived by Darwin, it is true both that evolution is the result of mutations arising by chance and that evolution is teleological in nature.

Statements that a species does something "in order to" achieve survival are teleological. The validity or invalidity of such statements depends on the species and the intention of the writer as to the meaning of the phrase "in order to." Sometimes it is possible or useful to rewrite such sentences so as to avoid teleology. Some biology courses have incorporated exercises requiring students to rephrase such sentences so that they do not read teleologically. Nevertheless, biologists still frequently write in a way which can be read as implying teleology even if that is not the intention.

Animal behaviour (Tinbergen's four questions) 

Tinbergen's four questions, named after the ethologist Nikolaas Tinbergen and based on Aristotle's four causes, are complementary categories of explanations for animal behaviour. They are also commonly referred to as levels of analysis.

The four questions are on:

 function, what an adaptation does that is selected for in evolution;
 phylogeny, the evolutionary history of an organism, revealing its relationships to other species;
 mechanism, namely the proximate cause of a behaviour, such as the role of testosterone in aggression; and
 ontogeny, the development of an organism from egg to embryo to adult.

Technology (Heidegger's four causes) 

In The Question Concerning Technology, echoing Aristotle, Martin Heidegger describes the four causes as follows:

causa materialis: the material or matter
causa formalis: the form or shape the material or matter enters
causa finalis: the end
causa efficiens: the effect that brings about the finished result.

Heidegger explains that "[w]hoever builds a house or a ship or forges a sacrificial chalice reveals what is to be brought forth, according to the terms of the four modes of occasioning."

The educationist David Waddington comments that although the efficient cause, which he identifies as "the craftsman," might be thought the most significant of the four, in his view each of Heidegger's four causes is "equally co-responsible" for producing a craft item, in Heidegger's terms "bringing forth" the thing into existence. Waddington cites Lovitt's description of this bringing forth as "a unified process."

See also

 Anthropic principle
 Biosemiotics
 Causality
 Convergent evolution
 Four discourses, by Jacques Lacan 
 Proximate and ultimate causation
 Socrates
 Teleology
 The purpose of a system is what it does, Anthony Stafford Beer's POSIWID principle

Notes

References

 Cohen, Marc S. "The Four Causes" (Lecture Notes) Accessed March 14, 2006.
 Falcon, Andrea. Aristotle on Causality (link to section labeled "Four Causes"). Stanford Encyclopedia of Philosophy 2008.
  1977.
 Hennig, Boris. "The Four Causes." Journal of Philosophy 106(3), 2009, 137–60.
 
 Moravcsik, J.M. "Aitia as generative factor in Aristotle's philosophy." Dialogue, 14 : pp 622–638, 1975.
 
 English translation of Study on Phideas, by Pía Figueroa written with theme of Final Cause as per Aristotle.

External links
 The Consequences of Ideas: Understanding the Concepts that Shaped Our World, By R. C. Sproul
 Aristotle on definition. By Marguerite Deslauriers, page 81
 Philosophy in the ancient world: an introduction. By James A. Arieti. p. 201.
 Doctrine of Being in the Aristotelian Metaphysics. By Joseph Owens and Etienne Gilson.
 Aitia as generative factor in Aristotle's philosophy*
 A Compass for the Imagination, by Harold C. Morris. Philosophy thesis elaborates on Aristotle's Theory of the Four Causes. Washington State University, 1981.

Philosophy of Aristotle
Causality
Concepts in metaphysics